The M3 Gun Motor Carriage (GMC) was a United States Army tank destroyer equipped with a 75 mm M1897A4 gun, which was built by the Autocar Company during World War II. 

After observing the new and often decisive, uses of armored vehicles on both sides during the French campaign of 1940, the US Army decided that it required a 75 mm self-propelled gun, based on the chassis of the M3 Half-track. This was initially known as the T12. However, after the addition of features such as the gun shield from the M2A3 (a carriage for the M1897A4), the new vehicle entered production under the name M3 Gun Motor Carriage (or M3 GMC). Because the number of M2A3 gun shields available was insufficient for the M3 GMC order, a new gun shield was designed. Variants featuring the new shield were designated M3A1 GMC.

The T12/M3 first served in the Philippines Campaign in 1942 with the Provisional Field Artillery Brigade in the anti-tank and the fire-support role. It then served in North Africa in tank destroyer battalions. It was used ineffectively in the Battle of Kasserine Pass and several other engagements, but was used with success in the Battle of El Guettar. It also served in the Allied invasion of Sicily, but was eventually superseded by the M10 tank destroyer. A total of 2,203 were produced, of which 1,361 were converted back into M3A1 half-tracks.

The M3 GMC also served in the Pacific theater, starting with the Battle of Saipan. It proved effective against the Japanese Type 95 Ha-Go and Type 97 Chi-Ha tanks. It later served in the Battle of Okinawa, the Battle of Peleliu and many other island battles.

Specifications
The M3 GMC was 20.46 feet (6.24 m) long, 7.29 feet (2.22 m) wide, 8.17 feet (2.49 m) high (including the gun shield), and weighed 20,000 pounds (9.1 t). Its suspension consisted of semi-elliptical longitudal leaf springs for the wheels and vertical volute springs for the tracks, while its transmission consisted of constant mesh. Its ground clearance was 11.2 inches (280 mm).

It had a White 160AX 147 horsepower (110 kW), 386 cubic inch (6,330 cc), 6-cylinder engine with a compression ratio of 6.44:1. It had a 150-mile (240 km) range, 60 US gal (230 L) fuel tank, a speed of 47 mph (75 km/h), and a power to weight ratio of 14.7 hp per ton. It was armed with one 75 mm M1897A5 with 59 rounds, had 0.25–0.625 in (6.4–15.9 mm) of armor, and a crew of five consisting of a commander, gunner, two loaders, and a driver. The M3 (with the M2A3 mount) could traverse 19° left and 21° right, elevate 29° and depress −10°. The M3A1 (using the M5 mount) could traverse 21° in both directions, but could only depress −6.5°.

Development
After the fall of France, the U.S. Army studied the reasons behind the effectiveness of the German campaign against the French and British forces. One aspect that was highlighted by this study was the use of self propelled artillery, however by 1941 there was little available in the U.S. Army's arsenal that could be used in such a role. The Army had a number of M1897A5 guns, sufficient for the mass-production for such a weapon, and the M3 half-track was coming into production. After some debate, the Army decided to place M1897A5 guns on the M3 half-track chassis, which was designated the T12 GMC. The M1897A5 gun was originally adapted for the M3 chassis by placing it in a welded box riveted to the chassis behind the driver's compartment. It was accepted by the Army on 31 October 1941.

A batch of 36 T12s was used for testing, while another 50 were built and transported to the Philippines. The 36 T12s were improved in multiple ways. The improvements included the inclusion of a mount that raised the gun shield, the replacement of the original gun shield with the M2A3 gun shield, and the addition of a  M2 Browning machine gun, which was later removed. After the final improvements were finished, the prototype vehicles were sent to the Autocar Company for production.

M3A1
As the existing supply of M2A3 gun shields was insufficient to meet requirements for the production of the M3, the Ordnance Department developed the M5 gun shield, which replaced the M2A3. The new design was designated as the M3A1 Gun Motor Carriage.

Service history

American use
The T12/M3 GMC first saw action with the U.S. Army in the Philippines in 1941–42, six months after it was designed. Fifty were shipped on convoys to the Philippines in the late summer and fall of 1941. Three battalions of the Provisional Field Artillery Brigade operated T12s against the Japanese when they invaded the Philippines. During the early part of the campaign, the vehicle was used to provide direct covering fire and anti-tank support. The Japanese captured a few vehicles in 1942 and used them in the defense of the Philippines.

By 1942, M3 GMCs were being used by tank destroyer battalions in the North African Campaign, each of which consisted of 36 M3s and four 37 mm M6 GMCs. The M3 GMCs, which were designed for ambushing tanks, proved to be inadequate for this task in the battles of Sidi Bou Zid and Kasserine Pass, mainly due to poor tactics. Nevertheless, the M3 was later used in the Battle of El Guettar with success, claiming 30 German tanks, including possibly two Tiger tanks, at the cost of 21 M3s. Some M3s also saw service in Allied invasion of Sicily (Operation Husky), but by that time, the M10 tank destroyer had replaced it in the U.S. Army. A total of 1,360 M3 GMCs were also converted back into M3A1 half-tracks.

The M3 also served with the U.S. Marines in the Pacific Theater of Operations and was first used in the invasion of Saipan. It proved highly effective against the Type 95 Ha-Go and the Type 97 Chi-Ha, in the fight against the Japanese 9th Tank Regiment on Saipan. It also served in the Battle of Peleliu and the Battle of Okinawa, and many other conflicts in the Pacific.

Allied use

The M3 GMC saw limited service with other countries as it was not widely supplied through the Lend-Lease program. A small batch of 170 vehicles was supplied to Britain, which used them in their Armoured Car Regiments which were the reconnaissance units of the armored formations. They were first used in the Tunisian Campaign with the Royal Dragoons. They were also used in Sicily, Italy, and later in France, but were gradually retired. The Free French Army also used M3s for training before receiving M10 tank destroyers. With two issued per squadron in practice they were used as an eight gun regimental artillery battery.

Production
A total of 2,202 M3 GMCs were produced from 1941 to 1943. Only 86 vehicles were produced in 1941, but production increased to 1,350 in 1942, with the remaining 766 completed in 1943. Production was stopped due to the introduction of turreted, purpose-built, tank destroyers, such as the M10 GMC.

See also
List of U.S. military vehicles by model number
T48 Gun Motor Carriage

References

Citations

Bibliography

 Berndt, Thomas (1993). Standard Catalog of U.S. Military Vehicles. Iola, WI: Krause Publications. 
 Berndt, Thomas (1994). American Tanks of World War II. Minnesota, MN: MBI Publishing Company. 
 Hogg, Ian V.; Weeks, John S. (1980). The Illustrated Encyclopedia of Military Vehicles. Englewood Cliffs, NJ: Prentice-Hall. 
 Hunnicutt, R. P. (2001) Half-Track: A History of American Semi-Tracked Vehicles. Navato, CA: Presidio Press. 
 Mesko, Jim (1996). M3 Half-tracks in Action. Carrollton, TX: Squadron/Signal Publications. 
 Ness, Leland S. (2002). Jane's World War II Tanks and Fighting Vehicles. New York, NY: HarperCollins. 
 Zaloga, Steven J. (1994). M3 Infantry Half-track 1940–1973, Oxford: Osprey Publications. 

World War II tank destroyers of the United States
World War II self-propelled artillery
Self-propelled artillery of the United States
World War II half-tracks
Half-tracks of the United States
Military vehicles introduced from 1940 to 1944